Kohler is a surname of German origin. The name was first found in Saxony. It means, "charcoal burner" so the first "Kohlers" were most likely of that occupation. Notable people with the surname include:

Alan Kohler, Australian journalist
Anton Kohler, German chess player
Berthold Kohler (born 1961), German journalist
Charles-Amédée Kohler (1790-1874), Swiss chocolate maker
Ernesto Kohler, flautist and composer 1849-1907
Fred Kohler, American actor
Josef Kohler, German jurist
Juliane Köhler, German actress
Jürgen Kohler, former German football player
Kaufmann Kohler (1843-1926), Reform rabbi
Klaus J. Kohler, German phonetician
Max J. Kohler, American lawyer
Richie Kohler, shipwreck diver and historian
Sheila Kohler, South African writer
Peter Kohler, American writer, historian and philanthropist

Kohler family of Wisconsin 

 David Kohler, businessman, President and CEO of Kohler Co.
 Herbert Kohler, Jr., businessman, Chairman of Kohler Co.
 John Michael Kohler, businessman, founder of Kohler Co.
 Terry Jodok Kohler, businessman
 Walter J. Kohler, Jr., governor of Wisconsin 1951–1957
 Walter J. Kohler, Sr., governor of Wisconsin 1929–1931

See also
Köhler
Koehler
Kahler (surname)

German-language surnames